Nazar Aqa (also Romanized as Naz̧ar Āqā; also known as Naz̧ar Āqā’ī) is a village in Zirrah Rural District, Sadabad District, Dashtestan County, Bushehr Province, Iran. At the 2006 census, its population was 2,146, in 473 families.

References 

Populated places in Dashtestan County